Epimechus is a genus of true weevils in the beetle family Curculionidae. There are more than 20 described species in Epimechus.

Species
These 21 species belong to the genus Epimechus:

 Epimechus adspersus Dietz, 1891
 Epimechus aemulus Fall, 1901
 Epimechus alutaceus Hatch, 1971
 Epimechus arenicolor Fall, 1901
 Epimechus canoides Fall, 1913
 Epimechus combustus Clark & Burke, 2001
 Epimechus curvipes Dietz, 1891
 Epimechus flavirostris Fall, 1928
 Epimechus gracilis Fall, 1913
 Epimechus hesperius Clark & Burke, 2001
 Epimechus mimicus Dietz, 1891
 Epimechus mobilis Fall, 1913
 Epimechus modicus Fall, 1913
 Epimechus molina Clark & Burke, 2001
 Epimechus nanulus Fall, 1907
 Epimechus nevadicus Dietz, 1891
 Epimechus nivosus LeConte, J.L., 1876
 Epimechus signum Clark & Burke, 2001
 Epimechus soriculus Dietz, 1891
 Epimechus stragulus Fall, 1907
 Epimechus vinosus Blatchley & Leng, 1916

References

Further reading

External links

 

Curculioninae
Articles created by Qbugbot